Fıratcan Üzüm (born 4 June 1999) is a Turkish professional footballer who plays as a midfielder for Ankaragücü.

Professional career
On 17 June 2019, transferred to Trabzonspor from Eskişehirspor, signing a 3-year contract. Üzüm made his professional debut with Trabzonspor in a 2-2 Süper Lig tie with Gençlerbirliği S.K. on 15 September 2019.

In the summer of 2022, Üzüm signed a 2-year contract with Ankaragücü.

Honours
Trabzonspor
Turkish Cup: 2019–20

References

External links
 
 
 

1999 births
Living people
Sportspeople from Eskişehir
Turkish footballers
Association football midfielders
Trabzonspor footballers
Eskişehirspor footballers
Ümraniyespor footballers
Adanaspor footballers
MKE Ankaragücü footballers
Süper Lig players
TFF First League players